Hell-Bent for Heaven is a 1926 American silent drama film directed by J. Stuart Blackton and written by Marian Constance Blackton. It is based on the 1924 Pulitzer Prize-winning play Hell-Bent Fer Heaven by Hatcher Hughes. The film stars Patsy Ruth Miller, John Harron, Gayne Whitman, Gardner James, Wilfrid North, and Evelyn Selbie. The film was released by Warner Bros. on May 1, 1926.

Cast       
Patsy Ruth Miller as Jude Lowrie
John Harron as Sid Hunt
Gayne Whitman as Andy Lowrie
Gardner James as Rufe Pryer
Wilfrid North as Matt Hunt
Evelyn Selbie as Meg Hunt 
James A. Marcus as Dave Hunt

References

External links

Lobby card at gettyimages.com

1926 films
1920s English-language films
Silent American drama films
1926 drama films
Warner Bros. films
Films directed by J. Stuart Blackton
American silent feature films
American black-and-white films
1920s American films